Kanur or Kanuru is a residential area of Vijayawada in Krishna district of the Indian state of Andhra Pradesh.  It is located in Penamaluru mandal of Vuyyuru revenue division. As per the G.O. No. M.S.104 (dated:23-03-2017), Municipal Administration and Urban Development Department, it became a part of Vijayawada metropolitan area.

Demographics 
 India census, Kanuru had a population of 49006. Of which male population is 26,574 and female population is 22,432. The average literacy rate is 85.07% and 4,401 of the population is under 6 years of age.

See also 
List of census towns in Andhra Pradesh

References 

Census towns in Andhra Pradesh
Neighbourhoods in Vijayawada